Space Weather Follow On-Lagrange 1 (SWFO-L1) is a future spacecraft mission planned to monitor signs of solar storms, which may pose harm to Earth's telecommunication network. The spacecraft will be operated by the National Oceanic and Atmospheric Administration (NOAA), with launch scheduled for February 2025. It is planned to be placed at the Sun–Earth  Lagrange point, a location between the Earth and the Sun. This will allow SWFO-L1 to continuously watch the solar wind and energetic particles heading for Earth. SWFO-L1 is an ESPA Class Spacecraft, sized for launch on an Evolved Expendable Launch Vehicle Secondary Payload Adapter (ESPA) Grande ring in addition to the rocket's primary payload. The spacecraft's Solar Wind Instrument Suite (SWIS) which includes three instruments will monitor solar wind, and the Compact Coronagraph (CCOR) will monitor the Sun's surroundings to image coronal mass ejection (CME). A CME is a large outburst of plasma sent from the Sun towards interplanetary space.

Together with space weather observation capabilities on the Earth-orbiting GOES-U satellite, SWFO-L1 constitutes the space segment of NOAA's Space Weather Follow On (SWFO) program. The aim of the SWFO program is to ensure the robust continuity of space-based measurement of the critical space weather environment. The Advanced Composition Explorer (ACE) is expected to consume its remaining propellant around 2024. Deep Space Climate Observatory (DSCOVR), NOAA's primary solar wind monitor, was launched in 2015 with a five year design lifetime. The European Space Agency-NASA Solar and Heliospheric Observatory (SOHO) will cease operation before the mid-2020s. SWFO-L1 SWIS instruments will replace ACE's and DSCOVR's monitoring of solar wind, energetic particles and the interplanetary magnetic field while CCOR will replace SOHO's LASCO (Large Angle and Spectrometric Coronagraph) imaging of CMEs.

Command and control system 
NOAA has awarded, on 5 February 2021, the Space Weather Follow On-Lagrange 1 (SWFO-L1) Command and control contract to L3Harris in Melbourne, Florida. The contract has a total value of US$43.8 million, with a five-year performance period. The SWFO-L1 mission is planned to launch in 2025 as a rideshare with the NASA Interstellar Mapping and Acceleration Probe (IMAP). The contractor is responsible for up to two years of operations support of a Command and control of the SWFO-L1 observatory. This will be accomplished by adding the capability to existing Geostationary Operational Environmental Satellite-R Series Core Ground System.

NOAA manages the contract. In addition to work at L3Harris' facility in Melbourne, the contractor will install equipment at the NOAA Satellite Operations Facility (NSOF) in Suitland, Maryland; NOAA's Wallops Command and Data Acquisition Station (WCDAS) in Wallops, Virginia; and at NOAA's Consolidated Backup Facility (CBU) in Fairmont, West Virginia.

The work will allow SWFO-L1 to provide continuity of solar wind and coronal mass ejection imagery data from the Lagrange-1 point to NOAA's National Weather Service Space Weather Prediction Center in Boulder, Colorado. These data are critical to support monitoring and timely forecasts of space weather events that have the potential to adversely impact elements vital to national security and economic prosperity, including telecommunication and navigation, satellite systems and the power grid. NOAA is responsible for overall implementation and funding of the SWFO program. The program is managed as an integrated NOAA-NASA program, where NASA serves as NOAA's acquisition agent for the space segment and for launch services. NOAA is responsible for the ground segment including the acquisition, development, test and integration of the SWFO Command and control system.

Instruments 
In April 2020, Southwest Research Institute (SwRI) was awarded a contract to supply SWFO-L1's magnetometer instrument.

On 1 July 2020, on behalf of NOAA, NASA has awarded the Space Weather Follow On-Lagrange 1 (SWFO-L1) Solar Wind Plasma Sensor (SWiPS) contract to Southwest Research Institute (SwRI) in San Antonio, Texas. SwRI was awarded a contract with a total value of US$15.6 million. The period of performance is 76 months. SWFO-L1 will provide NOAA with the continuity of solar wind data and coronal mass ejection imagery, the National Weather Service's highest priority for space weather observations. The SWFO-L1 satellite, which is planned to launch as a rideshare with the NASA Interstellar Mapping and Acceleration Probe (IMAP), will collect upstream solar wind data and coronal imagery to support NOAA's mission to monitor and forecast space weather events. NOAA is responsible for the Space Weather Follow On program. NASA is the program's flight system procurement agent, and NASA's Goddard Space Flight Center in Greenbelt, Maryland, is the lead for this acquisition.

Launch 
Space Weather Follow On-Lagrange 1 is planned to be launched as a secondary payload on the SpaceX Falcon 9 launch vehicle carrying NASA's Interstellar Mapping and Acceleration Probe (IMAP) spacecraft. As of December 2020, the launch was scheduled for February 2025, but has since been delayed to December 2025.

References

External links 
 Space Weather Follow On-L1 mission

Solar space observatories
2025 in spaceflight